San Francisco Records is a record label originally based in San Francisco, California, United States, and founded by music promoter Bill Graham and music producer David Rubinson in 1969 and was distributed by Atlantic Records. Since 2010 San Francisco Records has been operated by Ron Umile, former manager of the San Francisco band Quicksilver Messenger Service. Umile was also a talent agent for Associated Booking Corporation in the 1970s and represented B.B. King, Bobby "Blue" Bland, Bob Marley, Ramsey Lewis and other major attractions. As a tribute to Bill Graham and his personal love for jazz, Umile relaunched the label with a focus on contemporary jazz.

Artist roster
Current Roster
Tony Saunders
Rainforest Band
Rock Hendricks
Ashling Cole
Keystone Revisited
Past Roster
Cold Blood
Hammer
David Lannan
Tower of Power
Victoria

See also
 List of record labels

References

External links
 

American record labels
Rock record labels
Record labels based in California